VisBug is a Google open source chromium extension toolbar. It was released in 2018 and was marketed as FireBug for frontend web design. It has tools for changing web page layouts and helps for doing small CSS edits.

Features 

 Move tool
 Image swap
 Margin tool

References

External links 
 
 Github page

Microsoft Edge extensions
Google